Jonathan Casillas (born June 3, 1987) is a former American football linebacker. He played high school football at New Brunswick High School and college football at Wisconsin. He is of Puerto Rican and African-American ancestry.

College career
He played college football at Wisconsin.

Professional career

New Orleans Saints
He went undrafted in the 2009 NFL Draft, but was later signed as a free agent. Casillas was coming off surgery from a knee injury and was only a participant in the bench press at the NFL Combine.

In Super Bowl XLIV, he was officially credited with recovering the Saints's third-quarter onside kick to start the second half en route to their 31–17 victory over the Indianapolis Colts.

Casillas was expected to take over as the Saints' starting weakside linebacker for the 2010 season.  However, he suffered a foot injury during the last game of the preseason, and he was placed on the injured reserve list, ending his 2010 season.

Tampa Bay Buccaneers
Casillas signed with the Tampa Bay Buccaneers on March 13, 2013.  He played in 12 games before being placed on injured reserve after suffering a knee injury. On March 7, 2014, Casillas re-signed with the Tampa Bay Buccaneers on a one-year deal.

New England Patriots
Casillas, along with a 2015 sixth-round draft pick, was traded to the New England Patriots on October 28, 2014, for the Patriots' 2015 fifth-round draft pick.
On February 1, 2015, he won his second Super Bowl ring when the Patriots defeated the Seattle Seahawks, 28–24, in Super Bowl XLIX.

New York Giants
On March 10, 2015, Casillas signed a three-year, $10.5 million contract with the New York Giants. Signed as a special teamer, Casillas emerged as a starter for the Giants midway through the 2015 season.

In 2016, Casillas played in all 16 games with 15 starts, recording a career-high 96 tackles.

In 2017, Casillas started eight games before being placed on injured reserve on December 6, 2017 after battling wrist and neck injuries.

References

External links

New Orleans Saints bio
Wisconsin Badgers bio

1987 births
Living people
New Brunswick High School alumni
Players of American football from Jersey City, New Jersey
American football linebackers
Wisconsin Badgers football players
New Orleans Saints players
Tampa Bay Buccaneers players
New England Patriots players
New York Giants players